Victoria Centennial Fountain, also known as Back Fountain or simply Centennial Fountain, is installed outside the British Columbia Parliament Buildings in Victoria, British Columbia.

Description and history 
The fountain was designed by Robert Savery in 1962, and commemorates the four colonies and territories that formed British Columbia. The bronze sculptures of a bear, eagle, gull, sea otter, raven, and wolf represent the province's geography and history.

References

External links

 

1962 establishments in British Columbia
1962 sculptures
Animal sculptures in Canada
Sculptures of birds
Bronze sculptures in Canada
Fountains in Canada
Mammals in art
Outdoor sculptures in Victoria, British Columbia
Sculptures of bears
Wolves in art